Lekël is a community in the Gjirokastër County, southern Albania. At the 2015 local government reform it became part of the municipality Tepelenë.

Lekël was one of the Albanian Christian villages in the possession of the House of Moutzohoussates, the ancestral house of Ali Pasha.

Warm-summer Mediterranean climate predominates in this area.

Notable people
Anastas Byku, publisher of the bilingual Albanian-Greek Pellazgos magazine in 1860–1861 in Lamia, Greece
Gjergj Suli (1893–1948), Albanian Orthodox cleric and martyr
Georgios Vagias, Greek army general
Thanasis Vagias (1765–1834), general, counselor, and confidant of Ali Pasha

References

Populated places in Tepelenë
Villages in Gjirokastër County